In Sikhism, kesh (sometimes kes) (Gurmukhi: ਕੇਸ) is the practice of allowing one's hair to grow naturally out of respect for the perfection of God's creation. The practice is one of The Five Kakaars, the outward symbols ordered by Guru Gobind Singh in 1699 as a means to profess the Sikh faith. The hair is combed twice daily with a kanga, another of the five Ks, and tied into a simple knot known as a joora or rishi knot. This knot of hair is usually held in place with the kanga and covered by a turban.

The 52 commands of Guru Gobind Singh written at Hazur Sahib at Nanded in the state of Maharashtra, mention that the kesh (hair) should be revered as the form of the Satguru (eternal guru) whom they consider as the same as god. For this reason by practitioners they are kept with the utmost respect. This includes regular maintenance of hair which includes but is not limited to combing at least twice daily, washing regularly and not allowing for public touching.

Significance

Kesh is a symbol of devotion to God, reminding Sikhs that they should obey the will of God.

Bhai Nand Lal, who was a well-respected poet in the court of the 10th Guru, Guru Gobind Singh, wrote in Persian: 
Nishān-e-Sikhī ast īn Panj harf-e kāf,
Hargiz na bāshad azīn panj muāf,

Kara, Karad, Kacha, Kanga bidān,
Bina kesh hēch ast jumla nishān.
[These five letters of K are emblems of Sikhism. 

These five are most incumbent; 

Steel bangle, big knife, shorts and a comb; 

Without unshorn hair the other four are of no significance.] 

By not cutting it, Sikhs honour God's gift of hair. Kesh combined with the combing of hair using a kangha shows respect for God and all of his gifts.
So important is Kesh that during the persecution of Sikhs under the Mughal Empire, followers were willing to face death rather than shave or cut their hair to disguise themselves. The people are devout; not cutting their hair has been an emblem of their goodwill.

Modern trend

The tradition of keeping hair uncut has diminished in recent times, and it is estimated that half of India's Sikh men cut their hair. Reasons include simple convenience (avoiding the daily combing and tying), following their parents’ lead, and social pressure from the mainstream culture to adjust their appearance to fit the norm.

Harassment
After the attacks of September 11, 2001, Sikhs in the West have been mistaken for Muslims and subjected to hate crimes. Balbir Singh Sodhi, a Sikh living in Mesa, Arizona, was shot to death on September 16, 2001, when he was mistaken for a Muslim.

In 2007, an 18-year-old Pakistani, Umair Ahmed, forcibly cut the hair of a 15-year-old Sikh boy Harpal Vacher in a US school. In 2008, he was convicted by the jury of "second-degree menacing as a hate crime, second-degree coercion as a hate crime, fourth-degree criminal possession of a weapon, and third-degree harassment," and was sentenced to probation, community service, and  completion of a tolerance program.

In 2009, Resham Singh, a Punjabi student in Melbourne, Australia, was attacked by a group of teenagers who tried to remove his turban and cut his hair.

In 2010, Basant Singh, a Sikh youth in Penang, Malaysia, woke up discovering his hair was cut by 50 cm when he was asleep in his dormitory while serving the Malaysian National Service Training Programme. The incident traumatised the youth and is being probed as ordered by the Defense Ministry.

In September 2012, a member of Reddit uploaded a picture of Balpreet Kaur, a young Sikh, mocking her facial hair. She responded in a calm manner, explaining the meaning of her appearance and the original poster apologized. It then went viral.

References

External links
Hail Hair by Dr Birendra Kaur in All About Sikhs
PDF on the 5 Ks from Sikhnet

Sikh terminology
Sikh religious clothing
Punjabi words and phrases
Shaving